Édgar Fernando Pérez Greco (born 16 February 1982 in San Cristóbal, Táchira) is a Venezuelan striker currently playing for Deportivo Táchira.

International goals
Scores and results list Venezuela's goal tally first.

References

1982 births
Living people
Venezuelan people of Italian descent
Venezuelan footballers
Venezuela international footballers
Deportivo Táchira F.C. players
Asociación Civil Deportivo Lara players
Deportivo La Guaira players
Cortuluá footballers
Venezuelan Primera División players
Venezuelan expatriate footballers
Expatriate footballers in Colombia
Venezuelan expatriate sportspeople in Colombia
Association football forwards
Association football midfielders
People from San Cristóbal, Táchira